Poor Clare is a 1968 novel by the British writer L.P. Hartley. After inheriting some fine works of art from his aunt, a composer surprises everyone when he gives them away to his friends, leading all to wonder if there is some ulterior motive.

References

Bibliography
  Wright, Adrian. Foreign Country: The Life of L.P. Hartley. I. B. Tauris, 2001.

1968 British novels
Novels by L. P. Hartley
Hamish Hamilton books